Reinhold Batschi OAM (born 20 August 1942 in Sânpetru, Brașov County, Romania) is a former Romanian rower and leading Australian rowing coach. He was the inaugural Head Coach of the Australian Institute of Sport's rowing program and Head Coach of the Australian Olympic rowing teams from 1980 to 2000.

Rowing career
Batschi became involved in rowing as a result of Romania's compulsory national service. Representing Romania as a rower, Batschi won a bronze medal in the men's coxed fours at the 1967 European Rowing Championships. At the 1968 Mexico Olympics, his crew the men's coxed four finished seventh. He retired from competitive rowing in 1969.

Coaching career
Batschi competed a sports studies degree at the National Academy of Physical Education and Sport in Bucharest, Romania. In 1970, he became at coach at his rowing club in Bucharest. Batschi them moved to West Germany to become Head Coach  at the City of West Berlin Rowing Centre.  He coached the West German team to medals at the 1976 Montreal Olympics.

In 1979, he moved to Australia with his wife Florie and two daughters to take up the appointment of National Coaching Director for the Australian Rowing Council (Rowing Australia). In 1984, he was appointed inaugural Head Coach of the Australian Institute of Sport's rowing program. He held this position until his retirement in September 2007.

In 1986, Batschi coached the Australian men's eight which won the gold medal at the 1986 World Rowing Championships. This was the first and only time Australia won the men's eight at either the Olympic Games or at a World Championship.

Upon retirement in 2007 he was acknowledged for  "his pioneering work included a national program for technique development, a coach development program that was the forerunner of a national coach accreditation scheme, a program of international competition for up-and-coming rowers, improved selection procedures, and year-round training".

International representative coaching medal record

Olympic Games
Head Coach of the Australian Olympic rowing teams from 1980 to 2000. During his period as Head Coach, Australia won 16 Olympic rowing medals (four gold, five silver and seven bronze). He only directly coached teams in 1984 and 1988 Games.
1984 – Bronze medal – Men's eight
1988 – Fifth – Men's eight
2004 - Seventh - Men’s Quadruple Scull

World Championships
Head Coach in 1991 and 1999 World Championships. Results for crews coached at World Championships:
1983 Bronze medal – Men's eight 
1986 Gold medal – Men's eight 
1987 Fourth – Men's eight 
1989 Tenth – Men's four 
1990 Eight – Men's eight 
1991 Tenth – Men's eight 
1994 Fifth – Men's coxed four 
1995 Eleventh – Men's eight 
1997 Eighth – Men's coxless pair 
2001 Tenth – Men's quad scull 
2002 Fourth – Men's double scull; Fourteenth – Men's single scull 
2003 Fourth – Men's quad scull

Commonwealth Games
1986 – Gold medal – Men's eight ; Bronze medal – Men's Coxed Fours

Accolades
1987 – OAM for his services to rowing, particularly through coaching.
1990 – inducted in the Sport Australia Hall of Fame as a general member 
1991 – Eunice Gill Coach Education Merit Award.
2000 – Australian Sports Medal
2015 – Rowing Australia  renamed its National Training Centre in Canberra – The Reinhold Batschi National Training Centre
2016 – Distinguished Services to International Rowing Award.
 Life Member Rowing Australia

References

External links
 
 Reinhold Batschi interviewed by Robin Poke in the Sport oral history project, National Library of Australia, 2008
 
 
 

1942 births
Living people
Romanian male rowers
Olympic rowers of Romania
Rowers at the 1968 Summer Olympics
European Rowing Championships medalists
Australian rowing coaches
Australian Olympic coaches
Australian Institute of Sport coaches
Recipients of the Australian Sports Medal
Recipients of the Medal of the Order of Australia
People from Brașov County
Romanian emigrants to Australia
Sport Australia Hall of Fame inductees
Transylvanian Saxon people